Ottó Szigeti (22 December 1911 – 5 April 1976) was a Hungarian tennis player in the 1930s and 1940s.

Tennis career
Szigeti played under the name Ottó Schmidt as a professional.

As an amateur, he reached the semifinals of the French Open (losing to Bobby Riggs) and the fourth round of Wimbledon in 1939. In doubles, he reached the quarterfinals of the 1938 Wimbledon men's doubles.

References

External links

Hungarian male tennis players
1911 births
1976 deaths
Professional tennis players before the Open Era
Sportspeople from Pest County
20th-century Hungarian people